"Believe" is the winning  entry for the Eurovision Song Contest 2008 in Belgrade, sung by Dima Bilan. The song was written by Jim Beanz (a.k.a. James Washington) and Bilan himself.

Earlier, Bilan also represented Russia at the Eurovision Song Contest 2006, with the dark pop song "Never Let You Go", where he took second place.

In 2022, The Independent named it 37th best Eurovision-winning song of all time.

History

On 20 May 2008 Bilan sang in the first semi-final of the Eurovision Song Contest 2008, and the song was voted into the final by public vote.

It was performed 24th out of 25 songs in the final on 24 May 2008. The Russian figure skater, Olympic gold medalist and three-time world champion Evgeni Plushenko, skated on artificial ice on stage as part of the song performance, while the Hungarian composer and violinist Edvin Marton played his Stradivarius.

This song won the contest, finishing with a total of 272 points, becoming the fourth former Soviet Union country to win the annual contest. Dmitriy Medvedev, then president of Russia, admitted that he himself watched the contest and called right away to congratulate Bilan.

Music video 
In March 2008 a video was produced for the song Believe. The whole team took part in the production – Dima Bilan, Evgeni Plushenko, Edvin Marton and Yana Rudkovskaya, producer of Dima Bilan. The action of the video starts in a hospital where a mother finds out that her son has leukaemia and needs an expensive surgery. Then the action proceeds to a bar where Dima Bilan is watching TV and finds out that a child needs help. He immediately calls his producer, Yana Rudkovskaya, and tells her that they have to do something to raise money to help a child survive. They decide to give a charity concert with all the three participants performing. At the end of the video you can see the boy after the surgery. He smiles, gets up from the wheelchair and runs to greet the people who saved his life. Dima, Evgeni and Edvin meet the boy with presents happy that the money raised at the concert saved a child's life. The video is strongly connected to the song delivering the message that everything is possible in this world if you only believe.

Versions 
The song also has a Russian version ("All in your hands"), which was equally popular in many countries.

Track listing
Russian edition
 "Believe" (radio version)
 "Believe" (with violin)
 "Believe" (with violin, karaoke)
 "Believe" (Russian version)
 "Believe" (Russian version, karaoke)
 "Believe" (music video)
 "" 2.0 (music video)
 "" 2.0 (Karaoke)
 "Photosession"
 "Dima's biography" (in English)

German edition
 "Believe" (Eurovision version)
 "Believe" (radio edit)
 "Believe" (Russian version)
 "Believe" (music video)

Belgian edition
 "Believe" (radio version) – 3:17
 "Believe" (Russian version) – 3:17
 "Believe" (Spanish version) – 3:17
 "Believe" (music video) – 4:03

Release history

Charts

Weekly charts

Year-end charts

References 

Eurovision songs of Russia
Eurovision songs of 2008
2008 singles
Songs written by Jim Beanz
Eurovision Song Contest winning songs
Universal Music Group singles
EMI Records singles
Dima Bilan songs
2008 songs
English-language Russian songs
Number-one singles in the Commonwealth of Independent States